Querida enemiga (English: Dear Enemy) is a Mexican telenovela produced by Lucero Suárez for Televisa in 2008. The telenovela aired on Canal de las Estrellas from May 12, 2008 to October 10, 2008. Ana Layevska, Gabriel Soto and Jorge Aravena starred as protagonists, while Carmen Becerra starred as antagonist. The leading actress María Rubio starred as stellar performance.

In the United States, Univision broadcast Querida Enemiga from June 23, 2008 to November 28, 2008.

Plot
Lorena and Sara were raised together in an orphanage, and even though they have different personalities, they loved each other as sisters. Lorena dreams of starting her own family and loves to cook, while Sara is more materialistic; she has always hated the poverty of the orphanage, and she has more ambitions than values.

Lorena's greatest wish is to become a chef and so, one day she says goodbye to the nuns who raised her at the orphanage and leaves to study cuisine in Mexico City. That same day, Madre Asunción discovers that Sara had stolen some of the funds of the orphanage. However, after she confronts Sara, she suffers a heart attack and dies. To avoid getting caught any further, Sara runs with her lover and accomplice Chalo, who is also the delivery guy/driver of the orphanage. But before she leaves, she goes through the files Madre Asunción had in her office for each orphaned child and stole two files – hers and Lorena's.

When she finally reads them, she learns that she was found in the garbage dump, while Lorena was abandoned in the orphanage without explanation by her grandmother, the millionaire Hortensia Vallejo Vda. de Armendáriz. Sara's first impulse is to find Lorena and help her confront her grandmother and demand her rights, but then she reconsiders her options and decides to usurp her place in the Armendáriz gastronomic empire. Believing she would never see Lorena again, Sara thought her plan was foolproof.

Unaware of what happened, Lorena finds work as a cook's aid in her own grandmother's company – a lady who is ruthless in her work area and demands perfection from all her workers. Lorena also meets a young doctor called Alonso and they fall in love with each other at first sight. Later on, Sara has an unexpected reunion with Lorena in the company and the girl's constant presence infuriates her and feels that if Lorena were to ever know the truth of her past she may want to reclaim what is truly hers and she would be once again poor. So Sara's mind betrays her and she is gradually overwhelmed by a desire to take everything away from Lorena, including Alonso, and get rid of her once and for all.

When Lorena learns that Sara was abandoned by her grandmother, she cries for her friend and is filled with contempt for Hortensia. Meanwhile, Hortensia uses all her resources to avoid confronting the pain she has caused to everyone around her. Eventually, Sara managed to take away everything that belonged to Lorena, her life, her love and even her parents who for a while believed Sara to be their long lost daughter.

When Lorena starts to discover Sara's evil machinations against her, she realizes that she never truly knew the one she loved as a sister. But in spite of her broken heart, she will bravely face betrayal, deceit and cruelty and even find a new hope with someone she never expected to love – Ernesto, a man who at first glance seemed the total opposite of who she was. She never dreamed that they would have something special between them, but Ernesto managed to convince her otherwise. Slowly he reconstructs Lorena's broken heart, healing it with his love for her and showing her to love and trust someone else again.

Cast

Starring 
 Ana Layevska as Lorena de la Cruz
 Gabriel Soto as Alonso Ugarte Solano

Also starring 
 
 María Rubio as Hortensia Armendáriz
 Luz María Jerez as Bárbara Amescua
 Carmen Becerra as Sara de la Cruz
 Socorro Bonilla as Zulema de Armendáriz
 Alfonso Iturralde as Omar Armendáriz
 Héctor Ortega as Toribio Ugarte
 Danna Paola as Bettina Aguilar Ugarte
 Mauricio Aspe as Arturo Sabogal Huerta
 Miguel Ángel Biaggio as Chalo Carrasco
 Marco Méndez as Bruno Palma
 Luz Elena González as Diana Ruiz
 Patricia Martínez as María Eugenia "Maruja" Martínez de Armendáriz
 Bibelot Mansur as Rossy López Martínez
 Eduardo Rivera as Darío Aguilar
 Sharis Cid as Paula Ugarte Solano
 Zully Keith as Catalina Huerta
 Dalilah Polanco as Greta
 José Carlos Femat as Julián Ruiz
 Alexandra Graña as Jacqueline Hernández
 José Manuel Lechuga as Vasco Armendáriz Amescua
 Adanely Núñez as Valeria
 Mercedes Vaughan as Madre Carmelita
 María Alicia Delgado as Madre Trinidad
 Jorge Aravena as Ernesto Mendiola Chávez
 Jesús Zavala as Iván Liñán Mendiola
 Andrés Torres Romo as Alex Liñán Mendiola
 Karol Sevilla as Gina Liñán Mendiola

Special participation 
 Nuria Bages as Madre Asunción

Awards

Remake
In Greece, the Mega Channel bought the rights to make their own version, called Η ζωή της άλλης ("The life of the other"), it was broadcast for three seasons, entre 2009-2013.

References

External links

 at esmas.com 

2008 telenovelas
Mexican telenovelas
2008 Mexican television series debuts
2008 Mexican television series endings
Spanish-language telenovelas
Television shows set in Mexico City
Televisa telenovelas